James Prosser may refer to:

 James I. Prosser (born 1951), professor of environmental microbiology at the University of Aberdeen
 James Wesley Prosser, country music singer